Port Mahon Dockyard was a Royal Navy Dockyard located at Port Mahon, Menorca, Spain. It was opened in 1708 and in 1802 the port was ceded back to Spain. However a resident commissioner of the Royal Navy was still appointed as late as 1814. The dockyard was administered by the Navy Board and was part of the Mediterranean Fleet.

History

The Port Mahon Dockyard was established at Port Mahon, one of the world's deepest natural harbours, in 1708, following orders issued by the Admiralty to Admiral Sir George Byng the Commander-in-Chief of the Mediterranean Squadron. He was instructed to develop the Port of Mahon as a naval base following the capture of Minorca. The dockyard was located on the north side of the harbour, opposite Port Mahon town. In 1756 control of the dockyard was fought over during the Battle of Minorca (1756). During the 1760s naval storehouses were constructed. The dockyard was the Royal Navy's principal Mediterranean base for much of the eighteenth century; however the territory changed hands more than once in that time, before being finally ceded to Spain in 1802.

The dockyard was administered by the Navy Board and was part of the Mediterranean Station.

Administration of the dockyard and other key officials

The Master Shipwright was the key official at the royal navy dockyards until the introduction of resident commissioners by the Navy Board after which he became deputy to the resident commissioner. In 1832 the post of commissioner was replaced by the post of superintendent.

Resident Commissioner of the Navy, Port Mahon
Post holders included:
 1742-1744, Commodore Edward Falkingham, (also resident commissioner of the navy for Gibraltar)
 1744-1747, Captain Thomas Trefusis, (ditto)
 1747-1756, Captain John Towry, (ditto)
 1756-1763, Captain Charles Colby, (ditto)
 1798, Captain Issac Coffin 
 1814-1815, Captain Sir Jahleel Brenton (acting)

Naval Officer, Port Mahon
Post holders included:
 1727 Jun-Sep, Daniel Furzer 
 1727-1728, John Cook 
 1728-1731, Robert Hayes 
 1731-1734, Robert Gother 
 1734-1742, Thomas Sims 
 1755-1756, Milbourne Marsh

Master Shipwright, Port Mahon
Post holders included:
 1711-1728, Cornelius Purnell  
 1742-1760, John Varlo

Master Attendant, Port Mahon
Post holders included:

 1712-1720, Thomas Teddiman  
 1742-1744, Michael Pinfold  
 1744-1746, William Cumby  
 1746-1755, Mathew Moriarty

Clerk of the Cheque, Port Mahon
Post holders included:
 1716-1718, George Atkins 
 1718-1719, John Laton 
 1719-1723, John Reynolds 
 1738-1739, Christopher Robinson 
 1739-1742, Francis Gregson 
 1742-1748, Tyringham Stephens

Storekeeper, Port Mahon
Post holders included:
 1716 Jan-Sep, George Atkins 
 1718-1719, John Laton  
 1719-1723, John Reynolds 
 1738-1739, Christopher Robinson 
 1739-1746, Francis Gregson
 1746-1753, Thomas Foxworthy
 1763-1765, Milbourne Marsh
 1765 May-Nov, Milburn Warren
 1780, Christopher Hill Harris

Ships built at the dockyard
The Sloop of war HMS Minorca was built at the dockyard in 1779. In 1798 the 18 gun brig sloop HMS Port Mahon was also constructed here.
 HMS Minorca (1779) 
 HMS Port Mahon (1798)

Citations

Sources
 Archives, National (1708–1802). "Royal Naval dockyard staff: Port Mahon Dockyard on Minorca". The National Archives. London, England.
 Baugh, Daniel A. (2015). "Overseas Bases". British Naval Administration in the Age of Walpole. Princeton, United States: Princeton University Press. .
 Clowes, Sir William Laird (1897–1903). The royal navy, a history from the earliest times to the present Volume III. London, England: S. Low Marston.
 Dickinson, H. T. (2008). A Companion to Eighteenth-Century Britain. Hoboken, New Jersey, United States: John Wiley & Sons. .
 Harrison, Simon, (2010-2018). https://threedecks.org/Port Mahon.
 Owen, John Hely (2010). War at Sea Under Queen Anne 1702-1708. Cambridge, England: Cambridge University Press. .

 

Royal Navy shore establishments
Port Mahon